Vukadin Vukadinović (born 14 December 1990) is a Serbian professional footballer who plays as a right winger for Trinity Zlín.

International career
On 15 October 2016, he declared he had applied for Czech citizenship and was interested in representing the Czech Republic in international football. He confirmed his intention to join the Czech national team on 23 November, after encouragement from the national team coach Karel Jarolím and fulfillment of all legal requirements for receiving Czech citizenship. As of February 2018, he still has not received the citizenship, but reaffirmed his willingness to join the Czech national team once he has received it.

On 18 June 2021, he signed with Radnički Niš.

Personal life
Vukadinović is the older brother of fellow footballer Miljan Vukadinović.

References

External links 
 
 

1990 births
Footballers from Belgrade
Living people
Serbian footballers
Association football midfielders
FC Fastav Zlín players
FK Jablonec players
AC Sparta Prague players
FC Silon Táborsko players
FK Hajduk Beograd players
FK Viktoria Žižkov players
SK Slavia Prague players
Boluspor footballers
MFK Karviná players
FK Teplice players
FK Radnički Niš players
Czech National Football League players
Czech First League players
TFF First League players
Serbian SuperLiga players
Serbian expatriate footballers
Expatriate footballers in the Czech Republic
Serbian expatriate sportspeople in the Czech Republic
Expatriate footballers in Turkey
Serbian expatriate sportspeople in Turkey